Rookery Nook is a 1970 British television production by the BBC.

Sources
The BBC's production was based on the play Rookery Nook, one of the Aldwych farces, by Ben Travers.

First showing
First transmitted by the BBC on 19 September 1970, it was made in colour on videotape, but survives only as a monochrome telerecording.

Revival
The BBC's film was revived in 1994 by the National Film Theatre, the UK's leading revival house.

Cast
 Richard Briers ...  Gerald Popkiss 
 Arthur Lowe ...  Harold Twine 
 Joan Cooper ...  Gertrude Twine 
 Irene Handl ...  Mrs. Leverett 
 Elizabeth Knight ...  Rhoda Marley
 Moray Watson ...  Clive Popkiss 
 Francis de Wolff ...  Putz 
 Geoffrey Lumsden ...  Admiral Juddy 
 Mary Millar ...  Poppy Dickie
 Jenny McCracken ...  Clara Popkiss 
 Kathleen Saintsbury ...  Mrs. Possett

References

External links

1970 television plays
BBC television comedy
British television films
Aldwych farce
Television articles with incorrect naming style